Books Through Bars is an American organization that works to provide quality reading material to prisoners in Pennsylvania and surrounding states. New Society Publishers of Philadelphia founded Books Through Bars in 1990. Books Through Bars was separately incorporated as a nonprofit organization on March 19, 2001. There are approximately 30 similar, but unaffiliated, organizations throughout the United States.

Because prisoners in American prisons are not able to receive books from sources other than recognized publishers, bookstores, or other legitimate distributors, those without the financial resources to buy books have very limited access to them. Prison libraries are not being funded, in part because reading material is widely seen as irrelevant to a "mostly uneducated and indeed largely illiterate prison population". 
New Society Publishers began its program after it began receiving letters from indigent prisoners, and provides donated books to individual prisoners, prison libraries, and halfway houses. 
The organization distributes several hundred packages per month. It also sponsors regular public events relating to issues such as human rights, the war on drugs, and prison reform.

Books Through Bars is a 501(c)(3) nonprofit organization, formally organized as a collective and run by nine core members plus about twenty volunteers, and it is supported by grants from charitable organizations. Books Through Bars is entirely run and operated by unpaid volunteers.

References

External links
 
 "Building Blocks". Philadelphia City Paper. January 18, 1996. Archived from the original on April 14, 2005.
New Society Publishers

Book promotion
Charities based in Pennsylvania
Organizations established in 1990
Prison charities based in the United States